Coleophora willinki is a moth of the family Coleophoridae.

References

willinki
Moths described in 1999